Uncle Vanya is a play by Anton Chekhov.

Uncle Vanya may also refer to:

 Uncle Vanya (1957 film), directed by John Goetz and Franchot Tone
 Uncle Vanya (1963 film), directed by Stuart Burge
 Uncle Vanya (1970 film), directed by Andrei Konchalovsky
 Uncle Vanya (1990 film), directed by Antonio Salines
 Uncle Vanya (1991 film), directed by Gregory Mosher
 Uncle Vanya (2020 film), directed by Ross MacGibbon and Ian Rickson
 Uncle Vanya, a Russian fast-food chain replacing McDonald's after the latter closed its restaurants in 2022.

tr:Vanya Dayı